Ténenkou (or Tenenkou) is a village and commune and seat of the Ténenkou Cercle in the Mopti Region of Mali. In 2009 the commune had a population of 11,310.

The market that is held in the village on Thursdays serves many settlements in the surrounding region.

References

External links
.
.

Communes of Mopti Region